The Teledyne CAE J700 is a small turbojet engine designed to power unmanned air vehicles such as missiles. It was developed for and powers the ADM-141C ITALD air-launched decoy missile.

Design and development
In the early 1990s, Brunswick developed an improved version of the ADM-141 TALD decoy missile with turbojet power, the ADM-141C. Teledyne CAE responded by developing the J700 turbojet for the ADM-141C, giving the missile improved range and a flight profile resembling aircraft.

Variants
J402-CA-100
 Variant of the engine used in the ADM-141C ITALD.

Applications
 ADM-141C ITALD

Specifications (J700-CA-400)

References

Further reading
 

1990s turbojet engines
J700
Centrifugal-flow turbojet engines